The Old Social Democratic Party of Germany (ASPD), known as the Old Social Democratic Party of Saxony until 1927, was a political party in Germany. The party was a splinter group of the Social Democratic Party of Germany (SPD) in Saxony, and had nationalistic tendencies. Whilst the party failed to become a mass party, it played a significant role in state politics in Saxony during the latter half of the 1920s. A leader of the party, Max Heldt, served as Minister-President of Saxony 1926-1929. Wilhelm Buck was the chairman of the party.

Background to the split
Between 1924 and 1926 Saxony had been ruled by a coalition of SPD and two liberal parties. The coalition government became unpopular amongst the SPD ranks, and the grassroots of the party revolted against the government participation. The leftist sector of the Saxony SPD preferred a coalition of the SPD and the Communist Party of Germany. The SPD conference in Saxony in 1924 had called for the cooperation with the state government to be terminated, but a significant number of deputies in the Landtag disobeyed the decision. From November 1924 onwards, the dissident deputies were expelled from the party and responded by forming a party of their own, the 'Old Social Democratic Party'. The Old Social Democratic Party issued a press release in April 1926, stating the programmatic goals of the party. The party was formally constituted on 6 June 1926. The dispute between the leftwing of SPD and the rightist parliamentarian wing (which formed the 'Old Social Democratic Party') in Saxony was labelled the Sachsenkonflikt.

In the summer of 1926 all members of the Old Social Democratic Party were purged from the SPD mass organizations, such as the Socialist Workers Youth.

The party started a newspaper of their own, Der Volkstaat.

Drift towards nationalism
The 'Old Social Democratic Party' expressed a shift in ideological discourse. Soon after the foundation of the party, it began redefining itself, from viewing itself as the moderate wing of the German Social Democracy to a 'proletarian nationalist' ideological position (in contrast to the 'internationalist' and 'anti-state' SPD). The Volkstaat editor Ernst Niekisch (later a prominent National Bolshevik), whose influence within the party grew, was the architect of this process.

Niekisch's national revolutionary line was supported by Heldt, but others in the party leadership (Wilhelm Buck and Karl Bethke) opposed it.

The party was labelled as 'social fascist' by the communist press. Possibly, this was the first time this term was used in communist discourse.

The party was joined by August Winnig (former president of East Prussia), who had been expelled from the SPD for involvement in the Kapp Putsch. Through the recruitment of Winnig, the party hoped to expand its influence to other parts of Germany.

1926 election
Ahead of the October 1926 Saxony Landtag election, the party received a significant support amongst trade unionists in eastern Saxony (Dresden-Bautzen), which had been the stronghold of the SPD rightwing before the split. The party got 4.2% of the votes in Saxony, and won four seats in the assembly. The party continued to form part of the coalition government until the elections of 1929.

In the fall of 1927 the paramilitary organization Reichsbanner Schwarz-Rot-Gold expelled all members belonging to the Old Social Democratic Party, accusing the party of seeking alliances with fascists. At this stage the party began distancing itself from its bourgeois coalition partners, criticizing them from a nationalist angle. It began seeking cooperation with nationalist groups, such as Der Stahlhelm and Junge Deutsche Orden. The National Socialist German Workers' Party newspaper Völkischer Beobachter began writing positively about the positions of the Old Social Democratic Party. However, Völkischer Beobachter expressed concerns regarding the name of the party (which sought to identify with the Marxist roots of the SPD) and the position of the Old Social Democratic Party towards the Jewish population (which the National Socialists found too vague).

1928, 1929 and 1930 elections
The new, 'national revolutionary' profile proved to be a non-starter for the electoral work of the party. For example, Niekisch's national revolutionary line had alienated the trade unionists in the textile industry, who initially had supported the party. With their departure from the party, it lost whatever influence in the labour movement it once had. The party got 65,573 votes in the 1928 Reichstag election, but no seats. 35,000 of the votes had come from Saxony. After the election a new party programme was adopted, without any of the 'national revolutionary' references.

After the 1929 Landtag election in Saxony, the NSDAP demanded that the party (and the German Democratic Party) be excluded from the government. Wilhelm Bünger complied with this demand and left the Old Social Democratic Party out of the governing coalition. However, this decision was soon reverted and the Old Social Democratic Party politician Georg Elsner was reinstated as Minister of Employment and Welfare.

The party failed to win any seat in the 1930 Saxony Landtag election.

Disbanding
The party disintegrated in the early 1930s and some members who had not fully renounced Marxism, merged back into the SPD in July 1932.

References

1926 establishments in Germany
1932 disestablishments in Germany
Defunct social democratic parties
Defunct socialist parties in Germany
German nationalist political parties
Left-wing nationalist parties
National Bolshevik parties
Nationalist parties in Germany
Political parties disestablished in 1932
Political parties established in 1926
Political parties in the Weimar Republic
Social democratic parties in Germany